The Norwegian Under-16 Championship is an annual football knockout tournament involving Norwegian boys teams, with a maximum age of 16, that was first arranged in 2009.

List of finals

Performance by club

References

Norwegian Under-16 Cup at RSSSF.no

External links
Norwegian Under-16 Cup at fotball.no

Youth Cup
Norway
2009 establishments in Norway
Recurring sporting events established in 2009
National championships in Norway